The 2023 Women's Euro Hockey League will be the third edition of the Women's Euro Hockey League, Europe's premier women's club field hockey tournament, organized by the European Hockey Federation.

Amsterdam were the defending champions, having won their first title in the previous edition. They failed to qualify for this year's edition. The tournament will be hosted by Pinoké at the Wagener Stadium in Amstelveen, Netherlands from 6 to 10 April 2023 alongside the men's Final8. The draw was held on 14 December 2022.

Association team allocation
A total of 8 teams from 6 of the 45 EHF member associations would participate in the 2023 EHL Women. The association rankings based on the EHL country coefficients was used to determine the number of participating teams for each association:
 Associations 1–2 each had two teams qualify.
 Associations 3–6 each had one team qualify.

Association ranking
For the 2023 Euro Hockey League, the associations are allocated places according to their 2021–22 EHL country coefficients, which takes into account their performance in European competitions from 2019–20 to 2021–22.

Teams

 Den Bosch (1st)
 SCHC (2nd)
 Complutense (1st)
 Club de Campo (2nd)
 Gantoise (1st)
 Düsseldorfer HC (1st)
 Surbiton (1st)
 Pembroke Wanderers (1st)

Results

Bracket

Quarter-finals

Ranking matches

Semi-finals

Third and fourth place

Final

See also
 2022–23 Men's Euro Hockey League
 2023 Women's EuroHockey Indoor Club Cup

References

External links

Women's Euro Hockey League
Euro Hockey League Women
Euro Hockey League Women
International women's field hockey competitions hosted by the Netherlands
Euro Hockey League Women
Sports competitions in Amstelveen
Euro Hockey League